Karpoš is a neighbourhood in the Karpoš Municipality, City of Skopje, North Macedonia, and the seat of Karpoš Municipality. It is named after the famous Karposh hero.

Demographics
As of the 2021 census, Karpoš had 61,288 residents with the following ethnic composition:
Macedonians 49,483
Persons for whom data are taken from administrative sources 5,238
Albanians 2,203
Serbs 1,593
Roma 597
Vlachs 477
Turks 430
Bosniaks 185
Others 1,082

According to the 2002 census, the neighbourhood had a total of 37,162 inhabitants. Ethnic groups in the town include:
Macedonians 33,948
Serbs 1,503
Vlachs 308
Albanians 226
Turks 196
Bosniaks 68
Romani 54
Others 859

Sports
The local football club is FK Lokomotiva Skopje who play in the Lokomotiva Stadium.

References

Neighbourhoods in Karpoš Municipality
Neighbourhoods of Skopje